Marcel Adams  (2 August 1920 – 11 August 2020) was a Canadian real estate investor, billionaire, and Holocaust survivor.

Biography
Marcel Abramovich (later Adams) was born to a Jewish family in Romania in 1920. His father was a tanner. During World War II he was forced to work in Nazi labor camps (1941-1944). He escaped and fled first to Turkey and then to Mandatory Palestine where he fought for the independence of Israel. In 1951, he immigrated to Canada where he worked at a Quebec City tannery. In 1955, he began investing in real estate making a 70% profit on his first building. In 1958, he founded Iberville Developments and in 1959, he opened his first mall. Adams was retired and his son, Sylvan Adams, operated the company for almost 25 years, before being succeeded by his own son, Josh.  As of 2017, Iberville owns and manages a diverse portfolio of over 100 properties consisting of eight million square feet.

Personal life
In 1953, he married Annie Adams; they had four children: Julian, Sylvan, Linda, and Leora. His son Julian is a biochemist who led a team that developed the drug Velcade; his son Sylvan runs Iberville; his daughter Linda is a lawyer married to commentator Gil Troy; and his daughter Leora is a nurse. Annie died in November 1997.

Adams died on August 11, 2020.

References

Further reading
 Guy Mercier, Frédérik Leclerq, François Roy, Marcel Adams à Quebec. Les destins croisés d'un homme et d'une ville, en Pierre Anctil, Simon Jacobs dir.: Les Juifs de Québec. Quatre cents ans d’histoire. Presses de l'Université du Québec PUQ, Québec 2015, pp 195 – 220 (French)

1920 births
2020 deaths
Canadian billionaires
Canadian centenarians
Holocaust survivors
Jewish Canadian philanthropists
Canadian people of Romanian-Jewish descent
Canadian real estate businesspeople
Men centenarians
People from Piatra Neamț
Romanian emigrants to Mandatory Palestine
Romanian centenarians
Forced labourers under German rule during World War II
Israeli emigrants to Canada